Aqbolagh-e Sadat (also Romanized as Āqbolāgh-e Sādāt; also known as Aqjah Bulāq and Āqjeh Bolāgh) is a village in Hendudur Rural District, Sarband District, Shazand County, Markazi Province, Iran. At the 2006 census, its population was 283, in 63 families.

References 

Populated places in Shazand County